Family Man may refer to:

Film
The Family Man (1979 film), American drama  starring Ed Asner
The Family Man, American 2000 romantic comedy/drama starring Nicolas Cage
A Family Man, American 2016 drama starring Gerard Butler

Television
"The Family Man", March 9, 1954 episode of American TV series The Motorola Television Hour#Episode list
Family Man (American TV series), 1988 American sitcom starring Richard Libertini and Mimi Kennedy
The Family Man (American TV series), 1990–91 American sitcom starring Gregory Harrison
Family Man (Hong Kong TV series), 2002 Hong Kong drama
The Family Man (British TV series), 2006 British three-part medical drama
"Family Man", June 19, 2008 episode of American TV series Fear Itself
The Family Man (Indian TV series), 2019 Indian action drama

Literature
"Family Man", daily strip created 1940 by Reginald Ernest ("Reg") Hicks for The Sun (Sydney)

Music
"Family Man", song by James Taylor from In the Pocket, 1976
Family Man (Jaki Byard album), 1978
"Family Man" (Mike Oldfield song), 1982, also covered by Hall & Oates (1983)
Family Man (Black Flag album), 1984
"Family Man" (Fleetwood Mac song), 1987
"Family Man" (Craig Campbell song), 2010
Family Man, Shooter Jennings, 2012
"Family Man", song by Lily Allen from No Shame, 2018

People
Aston "Family Man" Barrett (born 1946), Jamaican reggae musician

See also
Family Guy, 1999 American animated sitcom